Riccarton is a suburb of Christchurch. It is due west of the city centre, separated from it by Hagley Park. Upper Riccarton is to the west of Riccarton.

History
On 12 April 1840, the ship Sarah and Elizabeth landed Herriot, McGillivray, Ellis, Shaw (and wife) and McKinnon (with his wife and child) who established a farm at Riccarton. They were the first European settlers on the plains." In January 1841, they abandoned their attempt to farm in the area.

Riccarton House was the homestead commissioned by Jane Deans in circa 1855. The Deans brothers, who along with the Gebbies and the Mansons were the second group of Europeans to settle in Christchurch on the same site as the first group in 1843.  Their original cottage is on the grounds, moved twice from its original position. Riccarton House is now a restaurant and function centre, and conducts regular tours. The Deans brothers, John and William, named the suburb after the parish in Ayrshire, Scotland, in which they were born. They were also responsible for naming the River Avon after the river of the same name in Lanarkshire, Scotland.

Antonio Hall is located on Riccarton Road. A large property with 279 rooms and once described as "one of the finest in Christchurch and vicinity", it has been left to decay despite a Category II listing with Heritage New Zealand. In July 2019, 30% of the building was lost to a fire started by a 14 year old youth.

The Al Noor Mosque on Deans Avenue was the site of a mass shooting during the Christchurch mosque shootings on 15 March 2019.

Riccarton Bush
Adjacent to Riccarton House is Riccarton Bush, a prominent feature also known as Deans Bush. The Māori word Pūtaringamotu means either ‘the place of an echo’ or ‘the severed ear’. The latter is a metaphoric expression referring to ‘bush isolated from the rest’. It is one of only four remnants of the original forest that covered the Canterbury plains, escaping the huge fires that swept across the province during the moa hunter period.  Another remnant, at Papanui, was cut down in the 1850s. The other two remnants were at Kaiapoi and Rangiora. It is dominated by kahikatea trees. A predator-proof perimeter fence has now been erected, with the hope of reintroducing kiwi to the reserve. In 1848, Scots brothers John and William Deans signed an agreement with the New Zealand Company to protect what was originally about 22 hectares of the kahikatea forest at Pūtaringamotu. In 1914, the 6.4 hectares that remained of Deans Bush was formally protected, with the passing of the Riccarton Bush Act 1914, spearheaded by prominent citizens of Christchurch, including Harry Ell and botanist Dr. Leonard Cockayne.

Riccarton Bush has played an important role in the history of New Zealand entomology, a number of native insects were first collected and named from Riccarton Bush. One of the first collections was of a plume moth Pterophorus monospilalis in 1859 which is now in the Fereday collection held in the Canterbury Museum. Thirty nine families of Lepidoptera are found in New Zealand; 27 of these occur in Riccarton Bush.  The moths of Riccarton Bush represent the majority of these families. The bag moth Mallobathra metrosema is only known to occur in Riccarton Bush.

Riccarton Racecourse Hotel
The Riccarton Racecourse Hotel is considered to be one of the most haunted places in New Zealand. It is said that the ghost of former licensee Donald Fraser walks the corridors of the hotel looking for his killer. In 1933, Fraser was murdered in the dead of night in his bedroom, where his wife was sleeping, by two blasts from a double-barrelled shotgun. Despite investigations, nobody was found guilty of the crime.

Governance
Until local government amalgamation in 1989, Riccarton was an independent borough. Since then, Riccarton is represented by the Halswell-Hornby-Riccarton community board. In the 2019 local government elections, Catherine Chu was elected as Councillor for the Riccarton ward.

Economy
The mall was first opened as Riccarton Mall in 1965, and has since undergone multiple redevelopments and expansions. The most recent of these took place in 2009, with the addition of a second floor and new carpark building, while plans for further expansions into neighbouring property are within the design process. This development underpins much of the economic activity in Riccarton, with the nearby stretch of Riccarton Road also a busy retail area with numerous motels.

Population
Riccarton is divided into five statistical areas by Statistics New Zealand. Four of these are primarily residential, and Riccarton Central is the commercial area.

Residential areas
The residential areas of Riccarton cover .

The residential areas, comprising the statistical areas of Mona Vale, Riccarton West, Riccarton South and Riccarton East, had a population of 9,198 at the 2018 New Zealand census, an increase of 879 people (10.6%) since the 2013 census, and an increase of 1,338 people (17.0%) since the 2006 census. There were 3,123 households. There were 4,821 males and 4,377 females, giving a sex ratio of 1.1 males per female, with 1,095 people (11.9%) aged under 15 years, 3,969 (43.2%) aged 15 to 29, 3,429 (37.3%) aged 30 to 64, and 702 (7.6%) aged 65 or older. Due to its proximity to the University of Canterbury, Riccarton is also home to many Christchurch students. The population of Riccarton is disproportionately younger as a result.

Riccarton is one of the most culturally diverse suburbs of Christchurch. Ethnicities were 53.4% European/Pākehā, 7.5% Māori, 3.5% Pacific peoples, 39.1% Asian, and 4.5% other ethnicities (totals add to more than 100% since people could identify with multiple ethnicities).

The proportion of people born overseas was 47.7%, compared with 27.1% nationally. After English, the next most common languages spoken are Tagalog, Sinitic, Northern Chinese and te reo Māori.

Although some people objected to giving their religion, 44.9% had no religion, 35.5% were Christian, 4.9% were Hindu, 3.8% were Muslim, 1.9% were Buddhist and 4.5% had other religions.

Places of worship cover a variety of faiths, including Christian churches, the Yolin Assemblies of God Korean Church, the Fo Guang Shan Buddhist temple, a Sikh temple on Kilmarnock St, and the Al Noor Mosque. The suburb is home to many of Christchurch's 2000 Muslim residents.

Of those at least 15 years old, 2,382 (29.4%) people had a bachelor or higher degree, and 786 (9.7%) people had no formal qualifications. The employment status of those at least 15 was that 3,927 (48.5%) people were employed full-time, 1,416 (17.5%) were part-time, and 423 (5.2%) were unemployed.

Riccarton Central
Riccarton Central includes Westfield Riccarton and the commercial area along Mandeville Street.

Riccarton Central had a population of 51 at the 2018 New Zealand census, an increase of 30 people (142.9%) since the 2013 census, and an increase of 21 people (70.0%) since the 2006 census. There were 21 households. There were 27 males and 21 females, giving a sex ratio of 1.29 males per female. The median age was 32.2 years (compared with 37.4 years nationally), with 3 people (5.9%) aged under 15 years, 18 (35.3%) aged 15 to 29, 24 (47.1%) aged 30 to 64, and 3 (5.9%) aged 65 or older.

Ethnicities were 70.6% European/Pākehā, 11.8% Māori, and 29.4% Asian (totals add to more than 100% since people could identify with multiple ethnicities).

The proportion of people born overseas was 35.3%, compared with 27.1% nationally.

Although some people objected to giving their religion, 47.1% had no religion, 29.4% were Christian and 11.8% were Buddhist.

Of those at least 15 years old, 18 (37.5%) people had a bachelor or higher degree, and 3 (6.2%) people had no formal qualifications. The median income was $33,800, compared with $31,800 nationally. The employment status of those at least 15 was that 27 (56.2%) people were employed full-time, 6 (12.5%) were part-time, and 3 (6.2%) were unemployed.

Education

Christchurch Girls' High School is a girls' secondary school for years 9 to 13, with a roll of  students. It opened in 1877.

Wharenui School is a full primary school for students in years 1 to 8. The school opened in 1907.

St Teresa's School is a Catholic full primary school for years 1 to 8. It opened in 1936.

Rolls are as of

Notable residents 

 Charlotte Godley
 Vicki Buck
 John Britten
 Kate Dewes

See also
 Riccarton Park Racecourse
 Riccarton Racecourse Siding

References

External links
 Riccarton Bush Act 1914
 Blog - "The place of an echo: Pūtaringamotu (Deans Bush)"

Suburbs of Christchurch